Angela Davis (born 1944) is an American political activist.

Angela Davis may also refer to: 

Angela J. Davis, American law professor
Angela Davis (musician) (born 1985), Australian saxophonist
Angela Davis (chef), American chef and food blogger

See also
Michaela Angela Davis, American writer